Angela Laverne Brown (born December 18, 1961) known professionally as Angie Stone, is an American singer, songwriter, actress, and record producer. She rose to fame in the late 1970s as member of the hip hop trio The Sequence. In the early 1990s, she became a member of the R&B trio Vertical Hold. Stone would later release her solo debut Black Diamond (1999) on Arista Records, which was certified gold by the Recording Industry Association of America and spawned the single "No More Rain (In This Cloud)".

After transitioning to J Records, she released her second album, Mahogany Soul (2001), which included the hit single "Wish I Didn't Miss You"; followed by the albums Stone Love (2004) and The Art of Love & War (2007), her first number-one album on the US Billboard Top R&B/Hip-Hop Albums chart.

Stone ventured into acting in the 2000s, making her film debut in the 2002 comedy film The Hot Chick, and her stage debut in 2003, in the role of Big Mama Morton in the Broadway musical Chicago. She has since appeared in supporting roles in films and television series as well as several musical productions, including VH1’s Celebrity Fit Club and TV One's R&B Divas, and movies such as The Fighting Temptations (2003), Pastor Brown (2009) and School Gyrls (2010).

Stone has been nominated for three Grammy Awards, and has won two Soul Train Lady of Soul Awards. In 2021, she received the Soul Music Icon Award at the Black Music Honors.

Early life
Stone was born in Columbia, South Carolina, where she began singing gospel music at First Nazareth Baptist Church, under the leadership of Reverend Blakely N. Scott. Her father, a member of a local gospel quartet, took Stone to see performances by gospel artists such as the Singing Angels and the Gospel Keynotes.

Career

1979–1985: The Sequence

In the late 1970s, when Stone was 16, she formed the rap trio The Sequence, a female hip-hop act, also consisting of Cheryl "The Pearl" Cook and Gwendolyn "Blondie" Chisolm. They were the second rap group signed to the Sugar Hill Records after auditioning for manager Sylvia Robinson backstage at a Sugar Hill Gang concert in South Carolina. In 1980, The Sequence scored a hit with their single "Funk You Up", which reached number 15 on the US Top Black Singles chart. The trio enjoyed a series of rap hits as the first female rap group during the early years of hip hop. Singles such as "Monster Jam" featuring rapper Spoonie Gee and "Funky Sound (Tear The Roof Off)" kept the band touring, with Robinson acting as their mentor. The group faded into obscurity as hip hop changed from its original party sound to a more gritty street art form and the trio eventually disbanded in 1985.

1986–2005: Vertical Hold, Black Diamond and career breakthrough
Stone then worked with hip hop and electro funk music group Mantronix, before becoming the lead vocalist of the trio Vertical Hold which released the popular single "Seems You're Much Too Busy" as well as two albums: A Matter of Time (1993) and Head First (1995). In 1996, Stone teamed up with Gerry DeVeaux, singer Lenny Kravitz's cousin, and Charlie Mole to form the group Devox. They recorded one album, Devox featuring Angie B. Stone, released in Japan by Toshiba EMI. Selected cuts were featured on Gerry DeVeaux's Front of the Line via the Expansion Records, which also included Stone-penned material. Signed to Jocelyn Cooper's Midnight Songs, Stone also shared songwriting credits on D'Angelo's first two studio albums, Brown Sugar (1995) and Voodoo (2000), as well as provided backing vocals when on tour with him. She also served as a backing vocalist on Lenny Kravitz's fifth studio album, 5 (1998).

In the late 1990s, Arista Records then A&R manager Peter Edge brought Stone to label head Clive Davis's attention. He offered her a solo recording contract with the label and in September 1999, her debut solo album, Black Diamond, was released. Named after her then-teenage daughter Diamond Ti'ara, it was released to positive reviews from music critics, and reached the top ten on Billboards US Top R&B/Hip-Hop Albums chart. Black Diamond was eventually certified gold by both the Recording Industry Association of America (RIAA) and the British Phonographic Industry (BPI) and spawned the Adult R&B Songs number-one hit "No More Rain (In This Cloud)". The single earned Stone two nominations at the 2000 Soul Train Music Awards.

In 2000, Stone transitioned from Arista to music manager Clive Davis's venture J Records. Also that year, she recorded the theme song for the UPN/The CW sitcom Girlfriends, starring Tracee Ellis Ross (as well as a cameo appearance from the third season episode "Blinded by the Lights"). She then released her second album Mahogany Soul on October 16, 2001, with the label. Involving a wider range of contemporary R&B musicians, Stone collaborated with Carvin & Ivan, Raphael Saadiq, Swizz Beatz, Alicia Keys and Eve on much of the album. Released to favorable reviews,
 it peaked at number four on the US Top R&B/Hip-Hop Albums, while reaching the top twenty of the Dutch, Finnish and Flemish Album Charts. Again, Stone was awarded gold by BPI and RIAA for Mahogany Soul. "Wish I Didn't Miss You", the album's second single, became her biggest international hit yet, reaching the top ten in Australia and Belgium as well as the top of Billboards Dance Club Songs. "More Than Woman", a duet with singer Joe, earned Stone her first Grammy Award nomination in the Best R&B Performance by a Duo or Group with Vocals category at the 45th ceremony.

In 2002, Stone had a guest role on Girlfriends and played store owner Madame Mambuza in the American teen comedy The Hot Chick, starring Rob Schneider. The film scored generally negative reviews from film critics for its vulgar and lowbrow humor, but became a moderate box office success in the US. The following year, the singer appeared in the role of Alma in the Jonathan Lynn's musical comedy-drama The Fighting Temptations alongside Cuba Gooding, Jr. and Beyoncé. Released to mixed reviews, it was commercially less successful than The Hot Chick. Stone recorded "Rain Down", a duet with Eddie Levert, for the accompanying soundtrack.

Stone Love, her third album, was released in June 2004. Davis consulted Warryn Campbell, Jazze Pha and Missy Elliott to work with Stone, who penned and produced half of the final track listing herself. The album debuted at number 14 on the US Billboard 200, selling 53,000 copies in its first week of release, and entered the top twenty in Belgium, Finland, Sweden and the Netherlands. Its release was preceded by the single "I Wanna Thank Ya" featuring Snoop Dogg, a top five hit in Belgium and Stone's second chart topper on the US Dance Club Songs. In 2005, Stone began recording what as expected to become her fifth regular album, but to save costs J Records asked her to transfer her new material, including the previously unreleased single "I Wasn't Kidding", to her first compilation album Stone Hits: The Very Best of Angie Stone, compromising songs from her first three albums. After five years with the company, Stone subsequently asked for and received an unconditional release from the label at the end of 2005.

2006–2014: The Art of Love and War and subsequent releases

In 2006, Stone appeared on the VH1's reality television series Celebrity Fit Club for the fourth season, which began on August 6, 2006. While on the show, she lost eighteen pounds, the second lowest loss in the history of the show. The same year, Stone signed to the reworked Stax Records. Her fourth studio album The Art of Love & War, a reference to her experiences in her final days at J Records, where it had become expected that she would help develop new talent, was released on October 15, 2007. The album debuted at number eleven on the US Billboard 200, selling 45,000 copies in its first week, becoming Stone's highest-charting album to date, as well as her first and only album to date to top the Top R&B/Hip-Hop Albums chart. Lead single "Baby", a duet with Betty Wright, became her second number-one hit on the US Adult R&B Songs and earned Stone her third nomination at the 50th Annual Grammy Awards.

Stone's second effort with Stax Records, her fifth studio album Unexpected, was released in November 2009. With its title partly referencing Stone's sudden and devastating loss of her father who unexpectedly died in the midst of her recording sessions for the album, it marked a slight move away from Stone's signature sound in favor of more upbeat R&B and funk influences. A commercial failure, the album debuted and peaked at number 133 on the US Billboard 200 and failed to chart elsewhere. "I Ain't Hearin' U", the album's lead single reached number 14 on Billboards Adult R&B Songs. In 2009, Stone had a minor role as a strip-club owner in Rockmond Dunbar's comedy drama Pastor Brown. Also that year, she sang "Wade in the Water" in the civil rights documentary Soundtrack for a Revolution (2009). In 2010, Stone then played the head matron of an all-girls school in the film, School Gyrls (2010), directed by Nick Cannon, which featured many Def Jam artists.

Along with NeNe Leakes, Stone co-starred in the play Loving Him is Killing Me that was performed in Washington, DC, Miami, and Philadelphia in May 2011. The play was written by Theo London and also starred Tyson Beckford and Christopher Williams. In 2012, Stone signed to Saguaro Road Records, an in-house music recording label of Time-Life, and released Rich Girl September 25, 2012. actor Malcolm-Jamal Warner contributed a poetry-slam-style spoken-word interlude to the record. Stone and Brian McKnight, who starred together in Chicago on Broadway, toured nationally in a production of Hinton Battle's Love Lies, which started with an engagement at the Warner Theatre in Washington, D.C. in April 2013. The cast also included Crystal Aikin and Elise Neal. Also in 2013, Stone appeared on season two of TVOne's R&B Divas. Stone's role was that of a mentor and life coach.

2015–present: Dream and Full Circle
In November 2015, Stone released her seventh studio album Dream on Shanachie Entertainment in collaboration with TopNotch Music and Conjunction Entertainment. Producer Walter Millsap III and Stone co-wrote the majority of the album with a core group that also included former The Clutch members Candice Nelson, Balewa Muhammad and producer Hallway Productionz. The album received positive reviews from critics who called the record "another solid and empowering effort," and debuted at number three at Top Hip-Hop/R&B Albums chart, with approximately 9,000 copies sold in its opening week. The album's first single, "2 Bad Habits" became a minor hit on the Adult R&B Songs chart. Following another label change, Stone released the cover album Covered in Soul through Goldenlane Records, compromising rendition of popular Phil Collins, Hot Chocolate, and Neil Diamond songs. Preceded by the single "These Eyes", a cover of the same-titled The Guess Who song, it failed to chart.

In July 2019, Stone released her ninth studio album Full Circle, on Conjunction Entertainment and Cleopatra Records. The album features the lead single "Dinosaur", produced by Walter Millsap III & Hallway Productionz.

Personal life
Stone has two children. Stone's daughter, Diamond, was born in 1984 and is from her marriage to Rodney Stone (also known as Lil' Rodney C!, from the hip-hop group Funky Four Plus One). Diamond contributed background vocals to Stone's 2007 song "Baby". Diamond gave birth to Stone's grandson in 2008 and another grandchild in July 2012.

During the 1990s, Stone dated neo soul singer D'Angelo. They have a son named Michael D'Angelo Archer II. He was born in 1998.

Stone lives in Atlanta, Georgia with her son, Michael and her daughter, Diamond.

In March 2015, it was reported that Stone had been arrested for assaulting her 30-year-old daughter.

Stone was diagnosed with Type 2 diabetes in 1999 and, along with comedian-actor Anthony Anderson, was part of the F.A.C.E Diabetes (Fearless African-Americans Connected and Empowered) program sponsored by Eli Lilly and Company, which helps African Americans understand their risk for the disease and how to control it. Stone said that both her mother and her mother's sister were diabetic.

Discography

Studio albums
 Black Diamond (1999)
 Mahogany Soul (2001)
 Stone Love (2004)
 The Art of Love & War (2007)
 Unexpected (2009)
 Rich Girl (2012)
 Dream (2015)
 Covered in Soul (2016)
 Full Circle (2019)

Filmography

Films

Television

Theatre

Awards and nominations

Wins
 2000: Soul Train Lady of Soul Awards: Best R&B/Soul Single, Solo for "No More Rain (In This Cloud)"
 2000: Soul Train Lady of Soul Awards: Best R&B/Soul or Rap New Artist, Solo
 2004: Edison Award for Stone Love

Nominations
 2003 Grammy Awards: Best R&B Performance by a Duo or Group with Vocals for "More Than a Woman" (with Joe)
 2004 Grammy Awards: Best Female R&B Vocal Performance for "U-Haul"
 2008 Grammy Awards: Best R&B Performance by a Duo or Group with Vocals for "Baby" (with Betty Wright)
 2008: BET Awards: BET J Award
 2008: BET J Virtual Awards: Album of the Year for The Art of Love & War

See also
 Honorific nicknames in popular music

References

External links

Angie Stone 2016 Interview at Soulinterviews.com

1961 births
Living people
21st-century American actresses
African-American record producers
American women record producers
African-American women singer-songwriters
American musical theatre actresses
American soul keyboardists
American television actresses
Concord Records artists
Musicians from Columbia, South Carolina
American neo soul singers
Actresses from Columbia, South Carolina
Sony Music Publishing artists
Participants in American reality television series
American film actresses
African-American actresses
D'Angelo
Musicians from South Carolina
Record producers from South Carolina
Ballad musicians
21st-century American women singers
20th-century American women singers
20th-century American singers
21st-century American singers
Singer-songwriters from South Carolina